Heston services is a motorway service station on the M4 motorway in the London Borough of Hounslow, built on land that once formed part of the now defunct Heston Aerodrome.

History
It is owned by Moto. The 11-mile £19m Chiswick-Langley section of the M4 (London - South Wales Motorway) opened on Wednesday 24 March 1965, together with the Heathrow Airport spur. During construction of this section, much vandalism took place near Harmondsworth and Harlington. The lighting of the site was provided by the street lighting division of British Lighting Industries. The 100 ft main lighting columns were supplied by British Steel Corporation's Northern and Tubes Group (Stewarts & Lloyds).

Out of London
The westbound side was opened on 4 March 1967. It had 46 petrol pumps. It was opened by Granada Ltd, and was their third service area after Toddington (1964) and Frankley (1966). It had been planned to open in July 1966.

The 2019 Motorway Services User Survey found that Heston's westbound side was in the top five motorway services in the UK for customer satisfaction.

Into London
The eastbound side was opened on 4 January 1968 by the then Miss United Kingdom, Jennifer Lynn Lewis and entertainer Joe Brown. The whole project had cost £500,000. The eastbound side is the part nearest the former Heston Aerodrome.

Location
Heston services is located between junctions 2 (Brentford Interchange, Lionel Road) and 3 (A312, Cranford Parkway Interchange) of the M4, near the suburbs of Heston and Cranford. It is one of only two motorway service stations within the M25; the other is London Gateway services (formerly Scratchwood services) on the M1, which opened in 1969.

Directly west of the westbound side is the British Airways sports ground; on the west of the sports ground was their Concorde Centre, now known as Heston Venue. The service station is in the TW5 postcode. Further west is Cranford Park.

Popular culture
Roger Moore is mentioned as passing Heston Services when supposedly on his way to appear in the first episode of Knowing Me Knowing You with Alan Partridge.

Heston services made a short but pivotal appearance in Edgar Wright's 2007 film Hot Fuzz.

Bryn from BBC’s Gavin & Stacey mentions, in the early episodes in the series, making a scheduled stop at either Leigh Delamere or Heston services on the family’s first trip from Barry Island to Billericay. In the 2019 Christmas Special, Nessa says, "Only a fool'd stop at Heston."

References

 Times 23 March 1965, page 16

External links 
Official Moto Site - Heston West
Official Moto Site - Heston East
Motorway Services Trivia Site - Heston
Motorway Services Online - Heston

1967 establishments in England
Buildings and structures in the London Borough of Hounslow
Commercial buildings completed in 1967
M4 motorway service stations
Moto motorway service stations
Transport in the London Borough of Hounslow
Transport infrastructure completed in 1967